Albert Groves (January 1886 – 1960) was a Welsh footballer and manager. A centre-half, he played for Aberdare Athletic, Wolverhampton Wanderers, Walsall, and Willenhall. He served Walsall as player-manager in the 1920–21 season.

Career
Born at Newport in January 1886, Groves began his career as a forward, playing for Aberdare Athletic. He signed with Wolverhampton Wanderers in August 1909. He made his Second Division debut at Molineux on the last day of the 1909–10 season, in a 3–2 win over Manchester City. Wanderers went on to finish ninth in 1910–11 and fifth in 1911–12, before Groves scored 10 league goals to help the club to a tenth-place finish in 1912–13. Over time, he was converted into a centre half and the club went on to finish ninth in 1913–14 and fourth in 1914–15, before World War I temporarily put a halt to the Football League. During the war he guested for Port Vale in October 1916, scoring three goals in 23 games before moving on to Bury and Sunbeam Motor Works (Coventry). Groves also guested for Stoke in 1915–16. After returning to "Wolves" after the war, he helped the club to a 19th-place finish in 1919–20. He was then appointed player-manager at Birmingham League outfit Walsall, before he was replaced by Joe Burchell. He remained on at Fellows Park as player-secretary, and scored eight goals in 36 games in 1921–22, as the club became founder members of the Third Division North. He continued to turn out for the "Saddlers" in 1922–23 and 1923–24, racking up 79 League, 12 FA Cup and 33 other senior appearances, scoring 15 goals. A serious knee injury led Groves to end his playing days at Willenhall and after retiring from football he ran the Hope and Anchor public house in Willenhall.

Career statistics

Honours
Aberdare Athletic
 Welsh Football League: 1908–09

References

1886 births
1960 deaths
Footballers from Newport, Wales
Welsh footballers
Association football wing halves
Aberdare Athletic F.C. players
Wolverhampton Wanderers F.C. players
Port Vale F.C. wartime guest players
Stoke City F.C. wartime guest players
Bury F.C. wartime guest players
Walsall F.C. players
Willenhall F.C. players
English Football League players
Association football player-managers
Welsh football managers
Walsall F.C. managers
English Football League managers